This is a list of electoral district results for the Queensland 2009 election.

Results by electoral district

Albert

Algester

Ashgrove

Aspley

Barron River

Beaudesert

Brisbane Central

Broadwater

Buderim

Bulimba

Bundaberg

Bundamba

Burdekin

Burleigh

Burnett

Cairns

Callide

Caloundra

Capalaba

Chatsworth

Clayfield

Cleveland

Condamine

Cook

Coomera

Currumbin

Dalrymple

Everton

Ferny Grove

Gaven

Gladstone

Glass House

Greenslopes

Gregory

Gympie

Hervey Bay

Hinchinbrook

Inala

Indooroopilly

Ipswich

Ipswich West

Kallangur

Kawana

Keppel

Lockyer

Logan

Lytton

Mackay

Mansfield

Maroochydore

Maryborough

Mermaid Beach

Mirani

Moggill

Morayfield

Mount Coot-tha

Mount Isa

Mount Ommaney

Mudgeeraba

Mulgrave

Mundingburra

Murrumba

Nanango

Nicklin

Noosa

Nudgee

Pine Rivers

Pumicestone

Redcliffe

Redlands

Rockhampton

Sandgate

South Brisbane

Southern Downs

Southport

Springwood

Stafford

Stretton

Sunnybank

Surfers Paradise

Thuringowa

Toowoomba North

Toowoomba South

Townsville

Warrego

Waterford

Whitsunday

Woodridge

Yeerongpilly

See also 
 2009 Queensland state election
 Candidates of the Queensland state election, 2009

References 

Results of Queensland elections